Stiphodon is a genus of freshwater gobies. They inhabit swift, clear streams close to the sea and are found in large parts of Asia and Oceania. Many of the 36 currently recognized species have extremely restricted distributions on single islands or even single streams. These are small gobies with bodies squarish in cross section. A female of Stiphodon multisquamus with a standard length of 60.4mm is the largest Stiphodon individual on record.

Species
There are currently 36 recognized species in this genus:
 Stiphodon alcedo Maeda, Mukai & Tachihara, 2012
 Stiphodon allen R. E. Watson, 1996 (Allen's stiphodon)
 Stiphodon annieae Keith & Hadiaty, 2015 
 Stiphodon astilbos P. A. Ryan, 1986
 Stiphodon atratus R. E. Watson, 1996 (Black stiphodon)
 Stiphodon atropurpureus (Herre, 1927)
 Stiphodon aureofuscus Keith, Busson, S. Sauri, Hubert & Hadiaty, 2015 
 Stiphodon birdsong R. E. Watson, 1996
 Stiphodon caeruleus Parenti & Maciolek, 1993
 Stiphodon carisa R. E. Watson, 2008 (Lampung hillstream goby)
 Stiphodon discotorquatus R. E. Watson, 1995
 Stiphodon elegans (Steindachner, 1879)
 Stiphodon hydroreibatus R. E. Watson, 1999
 Stiphodon imperiorientis R. E. Watson & I. S. Chen, 1998
 Stiphodon julieni Keith, R. E. Watson & Marquet, 2002
 Stiphodon kalfatak Keith, Marquet & R. E. Watson, 2007 (Kalfatak's stiphodon)
 Stiphodon larson R. E. Watson, 1996
 Stiphodon maculidorsalis Maeda & H. H. Tan, 2013 
 Stiphodon martenstyni R. E. Watson, 1998 (Martenstyn's stiphodon)
 Stiphodon mele Keith, Marquet & Pouilly, 2009 (Mele's stiphodon)
 Stiphodon multisquamus H. L. Wu & Y. Ni, 1986 
 Stiphodon niraikanaiensis Maeda, 2013 
 Stiphodon oatea Keith, Feunteun & Vigneux, 2010
 Stiphodon ornatus Meinken, 1974
 Stiphodon palawanensis Maeda & Palla, 2015 
 Stiphodon pelewensis Herre, 1936
 Stiphodon percnopterygionus R. E. Watson & I. S. Chen, 1998
 Stiphodon pulchellus (Herre, 1927)
 Stiphodon rubromaculatus Keith & Marquet, 2007
 Stiphodon rutilaureus R. E. Watson, 1996 (Golden-red stiphodon)
 Stiphodon sapphirinus R. E. Watson, Keith & Marquet, 2005 (Sapphire stiphodon)
 Stiphodon semoni M. C. W. Weber, 1895
 Stiphodon surrufus R. E. Watson & Kottelat, 1995
 Stiphodon tuivi R. E. Watson, 1995
 Stiphodon weberi R. E. Watson, G. R. Allen & Kottelat, 1998
 Stiphodon zebrinus R. E. Watson, G. R. Allen & Kottelat, 1998

References

 
Sicydiinae